Corey Louchiey (born October 10, 1971) is a former offensive tackle who played in the NFL from 1994 to 1997 for the Buffalo Bills. Louchiey attended South Carolina University where he played offensive tackle after transferring from South Carolina State University as a sophomore defensive tackle. He was drafted in the 3rd round of the 1994 draft by the Buffalo Bills.

References

1971 births
American football offensive tackles
Buffalo Bills players
Living people
Players of American football from South Carolina
South Carolina Gamecocks football players
South Carolina State Bulldogs football players
Sportspeople from Greenville, South Carolina